In Sweden, a military district was a military subdivision and part of Sweden's military-territorial division. The military districts were established in 1833 and were, after several reorganizations (1847, 1867 and 1889), replaced by army divisions in 1893. In 1942, the military district (Milo) were established who were multi-service commands of the Swedish Armed Forces. The military districts in the modern form were created in 1966, and each district was named according to the geographical district they covered. Several changes were made, such as creating or merging districts, until all military districts were disbanded in 2000. On 1 July 2000, the military districts were replaced by another military district (MD) organization, which was active until 31 December 2005.

History
Military district in Sweden, was from 1833 to 1892 the highest unit in which the Swedish Army troops were divided into during peace-time. The division, which was made in 1833, replaced the former division of "inspections" and "brigades". The military districts were initially six, but were reduced to five in 1847, after which the 1st Military District included Skåne, Blekinge and Kronoberg counties, the 2nd included Östergötland and the remainder of Småland, the 3rd included Västergötland, Halland, Bohuslän, Dalsland and Värmland, the 4th included Stockholm, Uppland, Södermanland, Västmanland and Närke and 5th included Dalarna and Norrland. The command in a military district was exercised by a Commanding General (general officer). All permanently or temporarily located troops of the army in the district, with the exception of the guard regiments, as well as the fortresses existing within the district, was under his command. In the re-splitting of the army into 6 divisions in 1888, the division into military districts was changed, whereupon the term covered only the territorial division. In the re-splitting of 1892, the designation also fell away and was replaced by arméfördelningsområde ("army division area").

In 1942, the military district (Milo) were established who were multi-service commands of the Swedish Armed Forces. The commander of a military district, the Militärområdesbefälhavare (also called Militärbefälhavare), commanded the Swedish Army divisions stationed in the region, the regional naval command, the regional air defence sector as well as the lower regional subdivision defence districts that made up the military district. The commander answered directly to the Supreme Commander. The military districts in the modern form were created in 1966, and each district was named according to the geographical district they covered. Several changes were made, such as creating or merging districts, until all military districts were disbanded in 2000.

Through the Defence Act of 2000, on 1 July 2000, the military districts were replaced by another military district (MD) organization, which was active until 31 December 2005. The new military districts geographically corresponded to the old military districts, but did not have territorial and operational tasks. Following the disbandment of the military districts, four Security and Cooperation Sections (Säkerhets- och samverkanssektioner, SäkSam sekt) were organized. The sections were led by the Swedish Armed Forces Headquarters, and had the task of coordinating the military security service and cooperating with regional authorities. From 1 January 2013, these sections were replaced by four military regions (MR). The military regions are intended to be subordinated to the Swedish Armed Forces Headquarters and coordinate the land-territorial operations. The military regions can to a certain extent be equated with the former military districts.

Military districts

1833–1847
The military district was established in 1833. Blekinge County stood outside the division and constituted the Flottans militärdistrikt ("Navy's Military District"), as did the island of Gotland. Gotland had an independent military organization, separated from the mainland, of which the highest military as well as civilian authority was exercised by the Governor of Gotland, who also was military commander and commanding officer of Gotland National Conscription.

1847–1867
In the 1847 subdivision, Blekinge County stood outside the division and constituted the Flottans militärdistrikt ("Navy's Military District").

1867–1889
The 1867 subdivision was operational from 1 April of that year.

1889–1893
The 1889 subdivision was operational from 1 January of that year.

1893–1942
Between 1893 and 1942, the military district concept was called army division.

1942–1966
From 1942, Sweden was divided into seven military districts (numbered I–VII). In connection with an organizational change in 1966, a name change was also implemented. The military districts took over the operational command, that is, the military district was responsible for the war planning in its district in the event of war.

1966–1990s

In connection with an organizational change in 1966, a name change was carried out in the military districts. The military districts took over the operational command, that is, the military district was responsible for war planning in the district in the event of war. Furthermore, the number of military districts was reduced when the VII Military District, which included Gotland, amalgamated into a command within the Eastern Military District.

1990s–2000
The 1966 organization lasted until the years 1991 and 1993, when the six military districts were amalgamated and formed three districts and a command.

2000–2005
Through the Defence Act of 2000, the military districts were disbanded and replaced another military district organisation. The new military districts geographically corresponded to the old military districts, however, they did not have the same territorial and operational tasks. These tasks were transferred to the newly established Joint Forces Command (OPIL). The military districts instead became the lowest level where the commander was territorially responsible, instead of the former defence district. Their main task was territorial activities, training of Home Guard and voluntary staff, and operations, primarily within the framework of community support. Within each military district, military district groups (militärdistriktsgrupper) were organized, a total of 29, which in principle took over the old division of the defence district, which largely followed the Swedish county division. The districts were disbanded in 2005 after the Defence Act of 2005.

See also
Military subdivisions of Sweden
List of Swedish defence districts

Footnotes

References

Notes

Print

Web

 
Military districts
Military history of Sweden